The following is a comprehensive discography of American ambient musician Tycho. His discography comprises six studio albums, one compilation album, two extended plays, and twelve singles.

Albums

Studio albums

Remix albums

Extended plays

Singles

Other charted songs

Remixes

References

Discographies of American artists
Electronic music discographies